IGK may refer to

Indo-Greek Kingdom
IGK@, Immunoglobulin kappa locus
Islamic Group in Kurdistan